St Xavier's College Ground (also known as KCA Cricket Ground) is a cricket ground in Thumba, Thiruvananthapuram, India. The first recorded match on the ground was in 2014/15. It was used as a venue for a first-class match in the 2016–17 Ranji Trophy tournament between Assam and Vidarbha.

See also
 List of cricket grounds in India

References

External links
St Xavier's College Ground at CricketArchive
St Xavier's College Ground at Kerala Cricket Association

Cricket grounds in Kerala
2014 establishments in Kerala